Olympiada may refer to:

 Olympiada, Chalkidiki, a village in the municipal unit Stagira-Akanthos, Chalkidiki, Greece
 Olympiada, Kozani, a village in the municipal unit Ptolemaida, Kozani regional unit, Greece
 Olympiada, Larissa, a village in Elassona
 Olympiada Patras, a multi-sport club in Patras, Greece
 1022 Olympiada, an asteroid named after the Olympic Games
 Olympias, mother of Alexander the Great
 "Olympiada", a piece of concert band music composed by Samuel Hazo

See also
 Olimpiada (disambiguation)